XHDOM-FM is a community radio station broadcasting to Iguala, Guerrero on 100.9 FM. It is known as Iguala Radio and owned by Domi Bello de Tenorio, A.C.

History
XHDOM came to air in April 2017 after receiving its social community concession on March 16 of the same year.

References

Radio stations in Guerrero
Community radio stations in Mexico
Radio stations established in 2017